The Wiesel Armoured Weapons Carrier (AWC) is a German light air-transportable armoured fighting vehicle, more specifically a lightly armoured weapons carrier, produced by Rheinmetall. It is quite similar to historical scouting tankettes in size, form and function, and is the only true modern tankette in use in Western Europe.

The Wiesel has been used in several of the Bundeswehr's missions abroad (UNOSOM II, IFOR, SFOR, KFOR, TFH, ISAF).

History
The Wiesel was developed for the German Army to meet a requirement for an air-transportable light armored vehicle for use by its airborne troops, as the infantry of the German Bundeswehr, especially airborne infantry, were considered unprepared to successfully fight enemy main battle tanks (MBT) in the 1970s. The requirements were that the vehicle should fit in common NATO transport planes and could eventually be air-dropped. It should be able to fight infantry as well as enemy tanks or aircraft. Porsche produced some prototypes of the future fighting vehicle for the Bundeswehr in 1975, but the Bundeswehr stopped the project in 1978 due to lack of funds. Nevertheless, Porsche continued development, because of interest from other countries.

The Bundeswehr eventually ordered 343 of the vehicles in 1985. The Wiesel was introduced as a new weapon system for the Bundeswehr with deliveries beginning in the late 1980s. The vehicle was named Wiesel ("weasel") because of its small size and agility, which make it very difficult to detect on the battlefield. Production of the Wiesel 1 ended in 1993. Of 343 Wiesel 1 vehicles, 210 were armed with Raytheon TOW wire-guided anti-tank guided missile system and 133 have the one-man KUKA turret E6-II-A1 armed with the dual-feed Rheinmetall Mk 20 RH-202 20 mm autocannon. Germany deployed both types to Somalia in 1993 as part of the United Nations forces intervention in the Somali Civil War (UNISOM II).

The Wiesel 2 is an enlarged and extended version of the Wiesel 1 with five road wheels instead of four, and a more powerful engine.  The Bundeswehr ordered 178 of the new vehicle in various types, including air defense, radar, and anti-aircraft missile launcher, 120 mm mortar carrier, command and fire control, and ambulance variants. The Wiesel 2 entered service in 2001.

Configuration

At only , it weighs less than the armored variant of the U.S. Humvee military light truck. The engine is a 64 kW (86 hp) Audi 2.1-litre diesel engine giving a top speed of 70 km/h (45 mph). It was manufactured by Rheinmetall AG.

The chassis is made of steel armour and can resist common 5.56 mm and 7.62 mm small arms ammunition and shell splinters. Air dropping the vehicle from a plane with parachutes was tested, but was not successful; four test-vehicles were destroyed. Nevertheless, the Wiesel can easily be flown in by transport helicopters, a single CH-53 Sea Stallion helicopter can fly in two at once, and common transport planes can carry four or more Wiesel vehicles.

Wiesel 1

Variants in service
 Wiesel 1 Aufklärung: reconnaissance
 Wiesel 1 ATM TOW: anti-tank vehicle fitted with TOW missiles
 Wiesel 1TOW: Updated with BMS
 Wiesel 1 MK20: fire support version with a Rheinmetall MK 20 Rh202 20mm autocannon
 Wiesel 1 MK20 Variant 1: updated with new sight
 Wiesel 1 MK20 Variant 2: updated with BMS
 Remotely controlled Wiesel 1 equipped with ground-scanning radar as part of the Route Clearance System

Prototypes and studies
 Wiesel 1 ATM TOW Resupply: cargo carrier fitted with racks for TOW missiles
 Wiesel 1 BTM-208: fitted with a SAMM BTM-208 turret armed with .50-cal (12.7mm) M2HB and 7.62mm Rheinmetall MG 3 machine guns
 Wiesel 1 ATM HOT: anti-tank vehicle fitted with HOT missiles
 Wiesel 1 ATM HOT Variant 1: fitted with UTM-800 turret
 Wiesel 1 Radar: fitted with RATAC-S multi-purpose radar
 Wiesel 1 MK25: 25 mm armed version

Wiesel 2

The Wiesel 2 is a stretched version of the Wiesel 1, with a fifth roadwheel. The engine was changed to a 1.9L Volkswagen in-line four-cylinder turbo diesel with direct injection and intercooler, giving 109 hp (81 kW) coupled to a ZF automatic transmission. The Wiesel 2 is generally bigger, faster and stronger than the Wiesel 1, with advanced features for the protection of the crew such as enhanced armour, an air conditioning system, and NBC protection.

Variants 
 Wiesel 2 Light Air Defence System (leichtes Flugabwehrsystem - LeFlaSys)
 Wiesel 2 Air Defence Command Post
 Wiesel 2 Air Defence Reconnaissance and Fire Control Vehicle (RFCV): fitted with an air defence radar
 Wiesel 2 Air Defence Weapon Carrier (Ozelot): fitted with air defence missile launchers (two box launchers containing four ready-to-fire FIM-92 Stingers, or, alternatively, a (currently unknown) number of vertical launch cells with LFK NG missiles)
 Wiesel 2 Ambulance
 Wiesel 2 Engineering Scout: combat engineer reconnaissance
 Wiesel 2 Command Post: battalion command post
 Wiesel 2 Advanced Mortar System
 Wiesel 2 Company C2/ JFSCT: Command and control for combined and joint fire
 Wiesel 2 Lightweight Armoured Mortar: 120 mm automatic laying weapon system
 Wiesel 2 Joint Fire Support Team: Reconnaissance Vehicle

Prototypes and studies
 Wiesel 2 APC: 2 + 4 crew armoured personnel carrier
 Wiesel 2 Argus: reconnaissance
 Wiesel 2 Carrier: ammunition resupply
 Wiesel 2 Primus: reconnaissance and fire control
 Wiesel 2 ATM HOT: anti-tank vehicle fitted with HOT missiles
 Wiesel 2 SYRANO: Robotic system for the French Army
 Wiesel 2 RMK 30: prototypes have been fitted with a Rheinmetall RMK30 recoilless autocannon

Gallery

Operators

Former operators(?)
  had procured 7 Wiesel 1s for evaluation (according to Tank Encyclopedia)

Current operators
  has ordered 343 Wiesel 1s and 179 Wiesel 2s (148 delivered)

Notes

References 
 

 Zwilling, Ralph. Waffentraeger Wiesel 1. 2009, Tankograd Publishing.

 Zwilling, Ralph. Waffentraeger Wiesel 2. 2009, Tankograd Publishing.

External links

Rheinmetall Defence Wiesel 1 Product Page
Rheinmetall Defence Wiesel 2 Product Page

Armoured fighting vehicles of Germany
Reconnaissance vehicles
Airborne fighting vehicles
Rheinmetall
Military vehicles introduced in the 1970s